Mother Dairy is a wholly owned subsidiary of the National Dairy Development Board which is a statutory body under the ownership of the Ministry of Fisheries, Animal Husbandry and Dairying of the Government of India that manufactures, markets and sells milk and dairy products. Mother Dairy was founded in 1974, as a subsidiary of the National Dairy Development Board (NDDB).

History 

Mother Dairy was commissioned in 1974 as a wholly owned subsidiary of the National Dairy Development Board (NDDB), under 'Operation Flood'. It was an initiative under Operation Flood, a dairy development program aimed at making India a milk sufficient nation. Mother Dairy sources a significant part of its requirement of liquid milk from dairy cooperatives and village level farmer centric organizations.

It originally focused on Delhi and other parts of the National Capital Region (NCR), and has 1500 milk booths and 300 safal outlets in the market. It later expanded to other regions in India. It currently sells milk and milk products through 400 Safal outlets.

Brands and subsidiaries 
The company sells milk products under the "Mother Dairy" brand, and is a leading milk supplier in Delhi-NCR, and sells around 30 lakh litres of milk per day in this region. It is also offers milk and milk prpducts.

Safal is the retail arm of Mother Dairy. It operates a large number of milk and milk product stores in the NCR, and also has a significant presence in Bengaluru. Safal also has a plant in Bengaluru, which produces around 23,000 MT of aseptic fruit pulp and concentrates annually. It supplies milk and milk products to food processing companies such as Coca-Cola, Pepsi, Unilever, Nestle, etc. Safal also has a presence across 40 countries viz., USA, Europe, Russia, Middle East, Asia and Africa and exports fresh fruits and vegetables (grapes, banana, gherkin, onion, etc.), fruit pulp & concentrate, frozen fruits & vegetables, etc. It also added some limited sweets in its portfolio and had been expanding it gradually.

It is first in the category in terms of milk and milk products ad for kids, are the three variants launched by Mother Dairy as its breakfast basket in July 2020. 

Mother Dairy is only present in dairy segment under the brand name Mother Dairy, which was launched under the Operation Golden Flow program of NDDB.

Mother Dairy opens first restaurant 'Café Delights' in Noida and plans more outlets in Delhi.

Revenue 
As of 2020, Mother Dairy has a revenue over ₹10,000 crore rupees or nearly $1.6 Billion.

Products

Mother Dairy Milk & Dairy Products 

Mother Dairy sells Milk and other milk products under the Mother Dairy brand.

Milk 
 Mother Dairy Dietz (Skim/skimmed milk) - Fat: 0.1%, SNF: 8.7%
 Mother Dairy LiveLite (Semi-skimmed milk) - Fat: 1.5%, SNF: 9%
 Mother Dairy Toned milk (Whole/regular milk) - Fat: 3%, SNF: 8.5%
 Mother Dairy Super-T Milk - Fat: 4%, SNF: 8.5%
 Mother Dairy Cow milk - Fat: 4%, SNF: 8.5%
 Mother Dairy Standardized Milk - Fat: 4.5%, SNF: 8.5%
 Mother Dairy FullYo Milk - Fat: 5%, SNF: 9%
 Mother Dairy Full Cream Milk - Fat: 6%, SNF: 9%
 Mother Dairy Ultra Milk - Fat: 7%, SNF: 9%

Dahi 
 Mother Dairy Ultimate Dahi
 Mother Dairy Probiotic Advanced Dahi
 Mother Dairy Classic Dahi
 Mother Dairy Mishti Doi
 Mother Dairy Aam Doi

Lassi 
Mother Dairy Lassi (Sweet, Mango, Strawberry, Mishti Doi Lassi)

Chach 
 Mother Dairy Chach
 Mother Dairy Premium Chach
 Mother Dairy Masala Chach
 Mother Dairy Tadka Chach

Probiotic Milk 
 Mother Dairy Nutrifit

Flavoured Milk 
 Mother Dairy Chillz

Mother Dairy Paneer

Mother Dairy Butter

Mother Dairy Bread 

In July 2020, Mother Dairy entered into selling bread in its business and also formalised plans to target to more than double its revenue to ₹25,000 crore in the next five years from this segment which was around ₹10,500 crore in year 2019.

Mother Dairy Cheese

Mother Dairy Ghee 

In November 2020, Mother Dairy had rolled out a new campaign #KhushbooApnepanKi focusing on Mother Dairy Ghee, which is aimed at highlighting, showcasing and evoking nostalgia and stimulating togetherness in winter and is planned for three-months which will be advertised across print, digital, radio and outdoor mediums, and is targeted to create awareness and enhance brand affinity for Mother Dairy Ghee amongst its consumers.

Mother Dairy Fruit Yogurt

Mother Dairy Cream

Packaged food Products 

In January 2021,company had launched three packaged food products – frozen drumsticks, frozen cut okra and frozen Haldi paste cubes – under its Safal brand on the occasion of Makar Sankranti and these new products in horticulture are sourced from tribals of Jharkhand which will help tribals with newer markets and will positively impact livelihood of tribals. With the addition of these vegetables frozen vegetable portfolio now offers 6 vegetable type options. The company is selling fresh fruits and vegetables through around 400 Safal outlets. The "Safal" brand currently also includes Frozen vegetables, pulses and honey.

Mother Dairy Milk Shakes

Mother Dairy Sweets 

Mother Dairy used to sell five packaged sweets – Milk Cake, Orange Mawa Barfi, Frozen Rasmalai, Gulab Jamun and Rasgulla and had recently launched two new varieties of sweets – Mathura peda and mewa atta laddoo. In year 2021 the organisation is targeting ₹100 crore sales from this new combinations.

References

External links

Cooperatives in India
Dairy products companies of India
Companies based in Noida
Indian companies established in 1974
Ice cream brands
Indian brands
Dairy farming in India
1974 establishments in Uttar Pradesh
Food and drink companies established in 1974